Gary Kalani Campbell (born March 4, 1952 in Honolulu, Hawaii) is a former American football linebacker who played seven seasons in the National Football League for the Chicago Bears.

1952 births
Living people
American football linebackers
Chicago Bears players
Colorado Buffaloes football players